Beijers park is a park in the city of Malmö, Sweden. It was founded in 1885 by Gottfried and Lorens Beijer but opened to public in 1904.

Gallery

External links

 About Beijers park  in Malmö Municipality's official website

Parks in Malmö